Reflection of the Negative is a split album by American doom metal bands Cough and Windhand. It was released on April 16, 2013 via Relapse Records.

Track listing

References

2013 albums
Windhand albums
Relapse Records albums
Split albums